Turów  is a village in the administrative district of Gmina Ścinawa, within Lubin County, Lower Silesian Voivodeship, in south-western Poland.

The name of the village is of Polish origin and comes from the word tur, which means "aurochs".

References

Villages in Lubin County